Alexys Nycole Sanchez (born June 29, 2003) is an American actress, best known for her role as Becky Feder in the 2010 comedy film Grown Ups and the sequel Grown Ups 2 (2013). In the 2011 MTV Movie Awards she won the award for Best Line for Grown Ups and Grown Ups 2.

Filmography

Film

Awards and nominations

External links

References

2003 births
Living people
American child actresses
American film actresses
Hispanic and Latino American actresses
People from Moses Lake, Washington
21st-century American women